Torsten Fenslau (23 April 1964 — 6 November 1993) was a German disc jockey and music producer, and can be characterized as an important pioneer in the early Sound of Frankfurt.

Career
From 1982 to 1993, Fenslau served as a DJ at the nightclub Dorian Gray in Frankfurt, Germany. He hosted two radio shows on Hessischer Rundfunk in Frankfurt until his death.

In 1988, he released his first production, "The Dream", through the group, Out of the Ordinary, which included snippets from the "I Have a Dream speech given by Martin Luther King Jr.

He founded his own label, Abfahrt Records, through which he released titles as Culture Beat, Die Schwarze Zone and Heute ist ein guter Tag zu sterben.

His greatest commercial success was founding the group Culture Beat in 1989. Their 1993 song "Mr Vain" topped the charts for several weeks in many European countries and found international success.

Death
On 6 November 1993, Fenslau was driving near Messel, Germany, when he skidded off the road and was ejected from his car. He died from internal injuries at the hospital.

References

External links 
 Sony Discography Culture Beat

1964 births
1993 deaths
German record producers
Road incident deaths in Germany